The Churchill Hospital is a teaching hospital in Oxford, England. It is managed by the Oxford University Hospitals NHS Foundation Trust.

History
The original hospital on the site was built in 1940 with the intention of providing medical aid to people suffering orthopaedic injuries as a result of air raids during the Second World War. This proved unnecessary, and the building was leased to the United States Army medical services, who were relocating from Basingstoke. The new American hospital was named after Sir Winston Churchill, the then Prime Minister, and was opened by the Duchess of Kent on 27 January 1942.

The US Army left the hospital at the end of the war and it was taken over by the local council and reopened as a conventional hospital in January 1946. The Churchill Hospital came under common management with the John Radcliffe Hospital in April 1993 and with the Nuffield Orthopaedic Centre in November 2011. New cancer treatment facilities were procured under a Private Finance Initiative contract in 2005. The new facility, which was built by a joint venture of Alfred McAlpine and Impregilo at a cost of £125 million, opened in 2009.

On 4 January 2021, the hospital was the first to administer the University of Oxford and AstraZeneca's AZD1222 COVID-19 vaccine (outside trials). This started the UK's rollout of the second vaccine to enter the programme.  Brian Pinker 82, was the recipient.

Facilities
As well as being an important centre for the treatment of cancer patients, the Churchill specialises in kidney transplants, diabetes, endocrinology, oncology, dermatology, haemophilia, infectious diseases, chest medicine, medical genetics and palliative care.

See also
John Radcliffe Hospital
Radcliffe Infirmary
Old Road Campus
Oxford Vaccine Group
List of hospitals in England
List of former United States Army medical units

References

External links
 Churchill Hospital information

Hospital buildings completed in 1940
NHS hospitals in England
Teaching hospitals in England
Hospitals in Oxford
Departments of the University of Oxford
Oxford Brookes University
Hospitals established in 1942
Closed medical facilities of the United States Army
1942 establishments in England